The Adults is a 2023 American comedy drama film, written and directed by Dustin Guy Defa and starring Michael Cera, Hannah Gross, Sophia Lillis and Wavyy Jonez. The film follows Eric, who has a plan to make a trip back home as short as possible but he finds himself balancing the relationship with his two sisters and his addiction to a local poker game.

It is nominated to compete for the Encounter Award at the 73rd Berlin International Film Festival, where it had its world premiere on February 18, 2023.

Synopsis
Eric wanted to have a short trip back home but as time passed it turns into a nostalgic stay as Eric catches up with his two sisters. His desire to prove himself to be the best poker player in town is also holding up his return. His sour relationship with his sister Rachel, and their little sister Maggie's attempts to revive the camaraderie they once shared, made Eric and Rachel face the reality of present divide between them.

Cast
 Michael Cera as Eric
 Hannah Gross as Rachel
 Sophia Lillis as Maggie
 Wavyy Jonez as Dennis
 Anoop Desai as Josh
 Kyra Tantao as Megan
 Kiah McKirnan as Amanda
 Simon Kim as Greg
 Lucas Papaelias as Bobby
 Tina Benko as Christina

Reception

On the review aggregator Rotten Tomatoes website, the film has an approval rating of 100% based on 6 reviews, with an average rating of 6.8/10. On Metacritic, it has a weighted average score of 69 out of 100 based on 6 reviews, indicating "Generally Favorable Reviews".

Damon Wise reviewing for Deadline Hollywood criticising the film wrote, "The Adults is a comedy-drama that doesn’t seem to deliver much of either, and that gray, in-between state just isn’t appealing anymore. Could it be that the cinema of awkwardness, or mumblecore in different clothes, has finally reached its sell-by date?" Rory O'Connor graded the film B+ for The Film Stage and wrote, "It’s coarse to the touch but The Adults is a tender film." Steph Green reviewing for IndieWire graded the film B and wrote, "A raw, sensitive, and true look at a family in flux with too much love to give and no tools to whittle it into something useful." Guy Lodge reviewing at Berlin Film Festival, for Variety wrote, "From... queasiness comes bristly tension, tautening and deepening what otherwise seems a low-key, low-stakes character study, and eventually a sweet, conciliatory sliver of hope too."

Accolades

References

External links
 
 
 The Adults at Berlinale
 

2023 films
American comedy-drama films
2020s English-language films
2020s American films
2023 comedy-drama films